Gahnia tristis is a tussock-forming perennial in the family Cyperaceae, that is native to parts of south east Asia.

References

tristis
Plants described in 1837
Flora of Thailand
Flora of Vietnam
Flora of China
Flora of Borneo
Flora of Malaysia
Flora of Sumatra
Flora of Taiwan
Taxa named by Christian Gottfried Daniel Nees von Esenbeck